Starfox (Eros of Titan) is a fictional character appearing in American comic books published by Marvel Comics. He first appeared in The Invincible Iron Man #55 (February 1973), created by Jim Starlin. He is depicted as a member of a human offshoot race known as the Eternals. He was born on Titan where he is the son of Mentor and the nephew of Zuras. Where Eros serves as the superhero Starfox, he is opposed by his mad brother Thanos, much like the rest of the universe. He has the power to psychically control other people's emotions. He was a member of the Avengers and Dark Guardians.

Starfox appears in the Marvel Cinematic Universe film Eternals (2021), portrayed by Harry Styles.

Publication history

Starfox first appeared in The Invincible Iron Man #55 (February 1973), which was scripted by Mike Friedrich with story and illustration by Jim Starlin.

Fictional character biography
Eros is a member of the Eternals, a genetic offshoot of humanity, that left for deep space from Earth thousands of years ago and settled on Saturn's moon of Titan. Eros is the youngest son of A'lars (also known as Mentor) and Sui-San, the nephew of Zuras, and the grandnephew of Uranos. He grew up on Titan to be a fun-loving, carefree womanizer and adventurer in contrast to his brother Thanos, a power-hungry, nihilistic conqueror. Only when Thanos launched his first major attack on Titan did Eros begin to take life a bit more seriously.

Years later, in a subsequent campaign of terror by Thanos, Eros fought alongside Titan's handful of survivors. Eros joined the alien Captain Mar-Vell in battling Thanos's minions. Eros was held captive by Thanos, who revealed that he had killed their mother. Eros was freed from captivity, met Iron Man and Moondragon, and assisted Mar-Vell and the Earth hero-team called the Avengers in the first major defeat of Thanos. Eros later met Pip the Troll, and his relationship with Heater Delight was revealed. Eros was later held captive by ISAAC, but was eventually freed. No longer bound by duty on Titan, Eros left the war-torn moon, seeking out pleasure and recreation on humanoid-inhabited worlds.

Eros returned to Titan to help console his cancer-stricken friend Mar-Vell when he retreated to Titan to spend his final days. Just before he died, Mar-Vell made Eros promise to take care of his Titanian companion Elysius after he was gone. Eros honored his vow for several weeks, until Elysius, realizing his wanderlust, released him from his promise. He left Titan and Elysius for Earth. He arrived on Earth, where he sought out and joined the Avengers as a trainee. They admitted him to their training program and the Wasp gave him the name Starfox, since they felt Eros was an inappropriate code-name. He then went on his first mission with the team, against Annihilus. He helped the Avengers vanquish the Wizard. He helped resuscitate the Vision with the help of ISAAC, and was later made a full Avenger. While on the team he had his first meeting with the Earth Eternals. Eventually, he revealed his pleasure-stimulating powers to the assembled Avengers, and helped them defeat Maelstrom. He traveled to another dimension with Spider-Man. He then helped the Avengers defeat Terminus. He battled the space pirate Nebula and learned of her claim to be the granddaughter of Thanos. He left the Avengers with Firelord to pursue Nebula. He eventually encountered and was defeated by the Xandarian villain Supernova who blamed Nebula for the destruction of his homeworld. Eventually he found Nebula. He was held captive by Nebula, but freed himself, and assisted the Avengers and the Stranger against Nebula.

Eros returned to a hedonistic life of adventure, preferring to wander space in search of romance and adventure. He would often return to help the Avengers in their adventures, serving during such cases as the Terminus crisis, Operation: Galactic Storm, and the Nemesis case involving the Infinity Gems and the so-called Ultraverse. When Thanos had gained the Infinity Gauntlet, one of the first things he did was capture Starfox and place him under various torments. Starfox was forced to witness various cosmic murders, power plays, the personal deaths of heroes he knew and other atrocities. He did attempt to charm Thanos out of his plan but had his mouth neutralized for his effort.

Starfox spent time with the son of Mar-Vell, Genis-Vell, and attempted on multiple occasions to assist him and steer him in the right direction. Once, he came up with a device that would block telepathic transmissions during sexual activity.

Starfox was part of a re-gathering of Avengers when Morgan Le Fay attacked all current and ex-members. After an adventure in an alternate universe, Starfox left Earth with Tigra, planning to head towards a known pleasure planet.

Eros and his brother, Thanos, have a custom, where each Eternal year (equivalent to 1,000 Earth years), they bury the hatchet and convene at a neutral place, usually bearing gifts. This was an initiative of their father, who demanded that the two would meet every year as a reminder of the blood that runs through both their veins. The meeting is called The Truce and the two meet alone, although the hero Quasar was present at one of their meetings, and they refuse to fight one another.

Allegations of sexual assault
Starfox was put on trial for sexual assault, accused of using his powers to seduce a happily married woman.  He was defended by lawyer Jennifer Walters, the She-Hulk. The law firm which employed her, Goodman, Lieber, Kurtzberg & Holliway, was contracted by Mentor to defend his son from the allegations. In the course of the trial, Ms. Walters came to suspect that Starfox had used his powers on her during their time in the Avengers, resulting in a brief sexual interaction. By this time, Starfox had been banned from the courtroom after it was determined that he was using his special abilities to influence the witnesses. When Jennifer Walters confronted Starfox with her suspicions via closed-circuit video link, he evaded her questions and then cut the video feed. Walters angrily charged out of the courtroom, transformed into She-Hulk, and caught Starfox as he was attempting to escape from Earth. She-Hulk dealt Starfox a savage beating, giving him no chance to defend his actions, knocked him unconscious, finally duct-taping his mouth shut to ensure that he could not use his abilities to elude punishment. However, Mentor, Starfox's father, effected his son's release by teleporting Starfox away to Titan.

Mentor eventually staged a native Titanian trial in the hopes of clearing his son's name. The Living Tribunal, interested in the equity of the process, called on She-Hulk as prosecuting attorney. Jennifer Walters, in an attempt to get to the bottom of the matter, agreed to a mind probe of both Starfox and herself. She discovered that Starfox did not use his abilities to influence her decision to have sex with him, but that he was deliberately responsible for her sudden infatuation with and marriage to John Jameson. An enraged She-Hulk once more lashed out at Starfox for toying with her life, bringing the legal proceedings to a halt.

Thanos now appeared at the trial and testified that his brother, Starfox, inspired his obsession with Death when they were children, when attempting to make young Thanos accept the death of an animal he had involuntarily killed with his enormous strength. By Titanian law, Eros would thus take full responsibility for all the genocides Thanos had later committed. In the following issue, it was revealed that this was a false memory that Thanos implanted into Starfox's mind and shared by a Thanos clone that the real Thanos sent. Thanos' implantation of the memory is what caused Starfox to briefly become mentally unbalanced and use his power in this manner for the first time. Starfox agreed to have Moondragon shut them off completely rather than risk hurting more people.

Return
Starfox is later seen living on Titan again, with his abilities restored. He is shown flirting with a number of women, but states that he will not use his powers to woo them. Ultron soon attacks Titan and assimilates the entire population (including Mentor) via a robotic virus, transforming the moon into Planet Ultron. Starfox flees to Earth and meets with the current team of Avengers (now led by the new Captain America), and teams up with them to liberate his world. He plays a key role in the Avengers' victory, using his powers on the half-organic Ultron to force the villain to have an emotional breakdown.

Infinity Conflict
In Thanos: The Infinity Siblings, after sleeping with different women on Titan, Eros is suddenly teleported into the future by his future self and is left stranded on a prehistoric world. Following a number of years, in the year 2079, his handmade radio finally caught a signal of a ship which rescued Eros. Then in the year 2125 Eros is forced to do an emergency landing due to his ship being damaged. He landed on the planet Zelchia which is ten times the size of Earth with a much higher gravity. Being unable to fly Eros is knocked out by the savage natives who plan to eat him. Thankfully, he is saved by the owl-like mutant native with teleporting powers named only Ghost. Ghost took Eros to his tribe, with the latter promising Ghost to technologically advance his people. After a year Eros bid them farewell and left Zelchia and went to the planet of Shangranna. He trained on the planet for a number of years until in the year 3812 he set this entire world ablaze. Then, in the year 4012, he encounters Kang the Conqueror, whose ship was partially destroyed by the stygian darkness of an omnipotent Thanos from the year 4657. After some negotiating, Kang tells Eros about the omnipotent Thanos losing to Hunger. Eros uses Kang time traveling technology to go back to the point he was originally transported to the future and sending his past self to the same future. After recruiting Pip to this cause, he then goes to Thanos and tells him about his omnipotent future self. He then proposes to Thanos a plan to avoid the darkness from destroying all of reality. After that, Eros and Pip go through time and arrived to the point where Eros first met Kang and stole some of Kang's time-travelling technology. They use the technology to go to the point where Eros departed Zelchia and offers Ghost and his people even more advanced weaponry from the Shi'ar. After a year, Eros manages to unite the planet's three main races in order to fight the threat of Thanos and his army, which was really all part of his plan. As Thanos and his army are about to attack the people of Zelchia, Eros teleports in front of Thanos and uses some drug to make him appear like Thanos killed him. After regaining himself and berating Thanos for the change of plans, he, Pip, and Ghost return to the present, not knowing that he was secretly manipulated by the future Omnipotent Thanos this whole time.

In Thanos: The Infinity Conflict, after Eros had Isaac miniaturize Kang's technology for easier transport, Eros secretly put a tracking device, utilizing Kang's technology, on an unsuspecting Thanos when the latter and his army were searching for him. After Thanos and his army leave, Adam Warlock and Pip arrive on Titan before Adam is killed by a missile launched by Thanos. After Eros and Pip inform each other on what is going on, they go to Zelchia the day before Thanos arrives so they can find out what Thanos is planning, but they find that the time line had changed and the planet is completely dead. They then go to Mistress Death's Realms, where they witness Thanos absorbing Death itself. In order to find what Thanos' plan is, Eros and Pip go one year into the future, where they see that Thanos had already absorbed the majority of the cosmic beings. They then decide to go even further into the future, where they find out that nearly all life of the universe has died out, because of Thanos. Eros decides that the only way to end the Mad Titan's nihilism is to go back to the day Thanos was born and kill the infant before he becomes a threat. However, just as Eros is about to suffocate the baby, Adam arrives and stops Eros from proceeding, telling him that Thanos' death would all be in vain since he was instrumental in the defeat of Magus. They then return to the present where Adam kills Eros so his soul could go to Mistress Death's realm. Believing that Eros is planning alongside Thanos, she banishes him from her realm, causing him to be resurrected. When Eros realizes that he now has become a person "out of the norm" just like Thanos and Adam, he lashes out at Adam, but Warlock tells him it was necessary, since Eros would be instrumental in defeating Thanos.

In Thanos: The Infinity Ending, when the three arrive at the domain of the Above-All-Others, they found out that they are already too late since future Thanos has already absorbed the Living Tribunal and Above-All-Others. However, thanks to Eros now existing outside the norm, the omniscient omnipresent Thanos could not clearly see him or Adam at that moment. After escaping the realm, unwillingly leaving Adam behind, Eros and Pip go to the present Earth, where Eros uses a backpack to keep Pip as near him as possible, thinking that despite, his newfound power, Thanos is still unable to track them down as long as they keep moving through space and time. They go to Thanos' starship, where they witness Thanos erasing the Outriders, Proxima Midnight, Corvus Glaive from existence, confirming his suspicion that Thanos is now erasing from existence anyone who might interfere with his plan. They decide to go into the future to the point where the universe ends. Upon arriving, they witness future Thanos committing suicide and taking everything in the Multiverse with him. After returning to the present and the destruction of Isaac by Thanos, Eros decides to go to key points in Thanos' life and remind him that he had a brother and that he was loved. This eventually proves to be all in vain because Thanos simply does not care; however, this does allow present Thanos, who had been trapped within the psyche of his future self, to use that little access of power to talk to Eros through his past selves and formulate a plan to stop his future omnipotent self. They go inside the psyche of future Thanos and try to free present Thanos but are finally discovered by future Thanos and assimilated into his universe. Thankfully, Kang, on behalf of Adam, goes to the point when Eros and Pip are about to go talk to Thanos' past selves and fetches them in his ship. This causes future Thanos to get distracted right as he is about to end everything, which allows present Thanos to take control and reset everything prior to the machinations of his future self. With everything back to normal, Eros is seen drunk at Starlin's Bar at Knowhere, seemingly with no recollection of all of this ordeal, after Kang went through time to prevent Eros from accessing his technology.

Forming the Dark Guardians
In the aftermath of the "Infinity Wars" story line, Starfox is present at Thanos' funeral. He shows all the guests a recording of Thanos stating that he uploaded his consciousness into a new body before his death. The funeral is attacked by the Black Order, who steals Thanos's body and rips open a hole in space, sending everyone into the rip. Everyone is saved by the arrival of Gladiator and the Shi'ar Empire. Starfox begins to recruit warriors to find Gamora, the most likely candidate to be Thanos's new body, as they form the Dark Guardians, which causes Cosmic Ghost Rider to side with them. Wraith brings up the issue of the Black Order, but Starfox assures they are searching for them, and Nebula states that the team should track down Nova to find Gamora's location. The Dark Guardians find Nova and ambush him, wounding him enough to crash land onto a planet. Wraith demands Nova to tell Gamora's location, stating the fact he does not want to harm him if does not have to. When Gladiator and Cosmic Ghost Rider order him to back off, Nova takes the chance to fly off, but the team plans to track him down again.

Death
After finding Gamora by following Nova and fighting off the Guardians of the Galaxy, the Dark Guardians captured her and brought her to Starfox who ordered Gladiator to kill her. However, Gamora's execution was interrupted by the Asgardian goddess of death Hela and the Black Order who subdued the Dark Guardians in short time. Hela then reveals that Thanos is not going to come back in Gamora but in Starfox. Moments later, Thanos' consciousness takes over Starfox's body and goes with Hela and the Black Order to Knowhere, where his body is being kept. Thanos laments that Starfox would not survive the transference of his consciousness into his body.

The Guardians and remaining Dark Guardians stormed Knowhere using Lockjaw's teleportation ability. To stop Thanos' resurrection, Gamora feels she has no choice but to kill Starfox. Apologizing to him, Gamora uses her sword to kill her adoptive uncle, who speaks briefly before dying. However, Starfox's death only causes Thanos to be resurrected with a broken mind. Thanos, Hela, and Knowhere are later sucked up by a black hole generated by Hela while the Guardians and Dark Guardians successfully flee using Lockjaw.

Rebirth
Starfox is later revealed to have been resurrected but kept as an inmate in the Exclusion, a key location for the Eternals, located between "six artificial molecules" beneath the South Pole in Antarctica. Sersi is able to employ Jack of Knives to help her into release Starfox from his prison in order to help against the Progenitor's judgment of Earth.

Powers and abilities
Starfox is a member of the long-lived offshoot of humanity known as the Eternals.  His body has been enhanced by cosmic energy to the point that it ages far more slowly than most humanoids and is superhumanly strong and resistant to harm and immune to terrestrial diseases. He can withstand impacts, such as falling from several stories or being repeatedly struck with superhuman force, that would severely injure or kill an ordinary human being with little to no injury to himself. However, he is far from invulnerable and can be injured by weapons, such as bullets or knives, composed of conventional materials. His overall resistance to injury is somewhat lower than that of the average Eternal but, like any Eternal, he possesses exceptional healing capabilities. He can harness his cosmic powers to enable himself to fly at supersonic speed. Through the gravimetric potential of his body, which is related to his ability to fly, a tiny shell of air constantly clings to his body. While he needs to breathe like an ordinary human being, he has a reduced need for oxygen allowing him to survive travel through both open space and underwater unaided.

Starfox can psionically stimulate the pleasure centers in nearby people's brains, making them calm and open to suggestion using his persuasion skill. It has been suggested that when in physical contact, and there is direct line of sight between the subject and the target, Starfox can use this euphoria effect to cause a person or persons to become infatuated with him, objects, or people of his choosing or simply to make others feel good while in his presence. Notably, the euphoria power does not work on his brother, Thanos. His psionic powers are possessed to some degree by all Eternals, but he developed them in his own unique manner. Starfox's mental powers do not work on beings whose brains do not have pleasure centers. These powers were later shut off at Eros' request to prevent them from being abused, but somehow returned prior to Avengers: Rage of Ultron.

In the series Captain Marvel, Starfox also showed the ability to manipulate gravity, simulating psychokinesis.  Starfox has limited mastery of 500 extraterrestrial languages.

In the mini-series event "Judgment Day", where the Eternals went to war with the mutants of Krakoa, Starfox refers to himself as a "mutant". His brother, Thanos, was always referred to as a mutant of the Titan Eternals.
 
Though an Eternal, Starfox is not as powerful as his Earthborn cousins because the original Titanian Eternals separated from their Earth brethren before Kronos' experiments augmented the Eternals' energies. Starfox, at least, can join an existing Uni-Mind with the other Eternals, even though Titanian Eternals have thus far proven to be unable to form their own.

Reception

Accolades 

 In 2015, Entertainment Weekly ranked Starfox 81st in their "Let's rank every Avenger ever" list.
 In 2015, BuzzFeed ranked Starfox 65th in their "84 Avengers Members Ranked From Worst To Best" list.
 In 2017, Den of Geek ranked Starfox 46th in their "Guardians of the Galaxy 3: 50 Marvel Characters We Want to See" list.
 In 2019, CBR.com ranked Starfox 13th in their "15 Most Powerful Eternals" list.
 In 2020, CBR.com ranked Starfox 10th in their "10 She-Hulk Love Interests" list.

Other versions

A zombified Starfox appears in Marvel Zombies vs. The Army of Darkness, alongside Hercules, She-Hulk, and Firestar, each of them infected. He is actually infected by the zombie Avengers when they sent out a bogus "Avengers Assemble" message and he is unaware it was really a trap.

In other media

Film 

 Starfox appears in the mid-credits scene of the Marvel Cinematic Universe film Eternals (2021), portrayed by Harry Styles. He transported himself alongside Pip to the Domo, meeting the Eternals Thena, Makkari, and Druig. Bearing a Celestial Communication Sphere, he claims to know the whereabouts of their friends after they were taken by Arishem the Judge and offers to take them there.

References

External links
Starfox at Marvel.com
Starfox at the Marvel Database

Avengers (comics) characters
Characters created by Jim Starlin
Comics characters introduced in 1973
Fictional characters with slowed ageing
Fictional characters with superhuman durability or invulnerability
Fictional empaths
Fictional linguists
Fictional rapists
Marvel Comics American superheroes
Marvel Comics characters who can move at superhuman speeds
Marvel Comics characters who have mental powers
Marvel Comics characters with accelerated healing
Marvel Comics characters with superhuman strength
Eternals (comics)
Fictional characters from the Solar System